Maackia is a genus of freshwater snails with an operculum, an aquatic gastropod mollusk in the family Amnicolidae.

Species
 Maackia angarensis (Gerstfeldt, 1859)
 Maackia bythiniopsis (Lindholm, 1909)
 Maackia costata (W. Dybovski, 1875) - type species
 Maackia herderiana (Lindholm, 1909)
 Maackia herderiana parvula Kozhov, 1936
 Maackia herderiana semicostulata (Lindholm, 1924)
 Maackia pusilla (Lindholm, 1909)
 Maackia raphidia (Bourguignat, 1860)
 Maackia umbilicifera (Starostin, 1926)
 Maackia variesculpta (Lindholm, 1909)
 Maackia werestschagini (Kozhov, 1936)

References

External links 

Amnicolidae